Visualize is a video release by Def Leppard. A compilation of promo videos, interviews, and concert footage. On DVD, it is bundled with Video Archive. It won a 1993 Metal Edge Readers' Choice Award for "Best Home Video."

Track listing
 Opening Statements and Titles
 "Rocket" (Video)
 "Switch 625" (Steve Clark Tribute)
 Solo Projects/Making Videos
 "Let's Get Rocked" (Video)
 Vivian Campbell joins Def Leppard
 "Make Love Like a Man" (Video)
 "I Wanna Touch U" (Video)
 "Have You Ever Needed Someone So Bad" (Video)
 Interviews
 "Tonight" (Video)
 "Heaven Is" (Video)
 Fans/Off Stage Life
 "Stand Up (Kick Love Into Motion)" (Video)
 Return to Sheffield
 "Two Steps Behind" (live in Sheffield)
 "Love Bites" (live in Sheffield)
 "Photograph" (live in Sheffield)
 The Future of Def Leppard

Certifications

References

Def Leppard video albums
1993 video albums
Music video compilation albums
1993 compilation albums
Def Leppard compilation albums